Ralph Adrian Ulveling (May 9, 1902 – March 21, 1980) was an American librarian best known for his support of intellectual freedom, interracial understanding, and the advancement of the library and information science profession. He is listed as one of the most important contributors to the library profession during the 20th century by the journal American Libraries.

Education and early career 
Ulveling was born in Adrian, Minnesota.

Before relocating to Michigan, Ulveling served as Reference Assistant at the Newberry Library in Chicago from 1924 to 1926 and then as Librarian at the Potter County Library in Amarillo, Texas from 1926 to 1927.

He attended the prestigious School for Library Science at Columbia University in New York City from 1927 to 1928.

Career 
As Chief of Branches for the Detroit Public Library, Ulveling oversaw the creation of the Detroit system for self-book-charging and the opening of the Parkman Branch Library.

While serving as the Associate Director of the Detroit Public Library from 1934 to 1941 and as chairman of the Legislative Committee of the Michigan Library Association (MLA), Ulveling won the first state aid for libraries in Michigan from the Michigan legislature in 1937. As President of the MLA from 1937 to 1938, he was instrumental in the creation of the Michigan State Board for Libraries by the Michigan legislature. After his tenure as president of the MLA, Ulveling served on the Michigan State Board for Libraries from 1938 to 1939.

Ulveling oversaw the continued expansion of the Detroit Public Library system with the opening of the Mark Twain branch library in 1939 and the Bookmobile service in 1940. Soon after, Ulveling became Director of the Detroit Public Library in 1941, a position he would serve in for over 26 years.

In 1942, Ulveling helped form the Friends of the Detroit Public Library, a group of community leaders dedicated to advancing the DPL through fundraising and public awareness activities.

As President of the American Library Association (ALA) from 1945 to 1946, Ralph Ulveling served as member of the First U.S. National Commission for the United Nations Educational, Scientific, and Cultural Organization (UNESCO).

In 1957, Ulveling inadvertently created a nationwide censorship controversy when his disparaging remarks about The Wizard of Oz were printed in the Lansing State Journal.  Ulveling criticized the book's "negativism" and said that "instead of setting a high goal...it drags young minds down to a cowardly level".  Leading national publications and the author's son Frank Joslyn Baum editorialized against Ulveling's comments.  Ulveling responded that not adding new copies of the book was "not banning...it is selection."

Personal life 
Ralph Ulveling married the former Elizabeth Baer on December 16, 1939, and had three children, daughters Honor (b. 1942) and Ann (b. 1947), and son, Roger (b. 1943).

References

External links

 Works by Ralph A. Ulveling at WorldCat

 

1902 births
1980 deaths
American librarians
Presidents of the American Library Association
People from Detroit
People from Adrian, Minnesota
Columbia University School of Library Service alumni
History of Detroit